In Greek mythology, Donakis was one of the seven Hesperides and sister of Aiopis, Antheia, Kalypso, Mermesa, Nelisa and Tara.

Note

Reference 

 Walters, Henry Beauchamp, History of Ancient Pottery, Greek, Etruscan, and Roman, Based on the Work of Samuel Birch, Volume 2, London, J. Murray, 1905.

Hesperides
Nymphs